Enrique Tierno Galván (Madrid, 8 February 1918 – Madrid, 19 January 1986) was a Spanish politician, sociologist, lawyer and essayist, best known for being the Mayor of Madrid from 1979 to 1986, at the beginning of the new period of Spanish democracy. His time as Mayor of Madrid was marked by the development of Madrid both administratively and socially, and the cultural movement known as the Movida madrileña.

Career

Early career

He fought in the Spanish Civil War in the Republican faction. After the war ended, he continued his studies and got a Ph.D. in Law and another in Philosophy. He held a Chair of Professor at the University of Murcia from 1948 to 1953, and at the University of Salamanca from 1953 until 1965. Afterwards, he worked as a lawyer and occasional professor at 
Princeton University, Bryn Mawr College and the University of Puerto Rico in San Juan.

Writer

As a writer, he authored over 30 books, and translated important works such as the Tractatus Logico-Philosophicus of Ludwig Wittgenstein.

In 1978 he was chosen to write the preamble to the Spanish Constitution.

Politician

He founded the Popular Socialist Party (social democrats) in 1968 and was its president until 1978, when it merged with the larger Spanish Socialist Workers' Party. In 1979 and 1982 he was one of the members of that party elected to the Congress of Deputies.

He was elected Mayor of Madrid after the polls of 3 April 1979. As a candidate from the Spanish Socialist Workers' Party, he was the first leftist Mayor of Madrid after four decades of Francoist government. Reelected in 1983, he would remain in office until his death in 1986.

During his time as Mayor of Madrid, in addition to his support of the cultural changes of the Movida Madrileña, he promoted or finished many improvements to the city such as the traffic tunnels by the Atocha railway station, the development of incentives to use buses and other mass transports, the cleaning of the Manzanares river, the main market of the city (Mercamadrid) or the reorganization of the Districts of Madrid.

Death
He died in Madrid on 19 January 1986 from a cardiac arrest aged 67. He was interred at cementerio de la Almudena two days later.

References 

 Special TV program by RTVE in 1986 about his life. (in Spanish)

External links 

1918 births
1986 deaths
People from Madrid
Mayors of Madrid
Academic staff of the University of Murcia
Spanish essayists
Spanish male writers
Spanish Socialist Workers' Party politicians
Members of the 1st Congress of Deputies (Spain)
Members of the 2nd Congress of Deputies (Spain)
Male essayists
Academic staff of the University of Salamanca
Madrid city councillors (1983–1987)
Madrid city councillors (1979–1983)
20th-century essayists
Spanish expatriates in the United States